Black Knight: The Man Who Guards Me is a South Korean television series starring Kim Rae-won in titular role alongside Shin Se-kyung, Seo Ji-hye, and Chang Mi-hee. It aired on KBS2 starting December 6, 2017 every Wednesday and Thursday at 22:00 (KST) for 20 episodes.

Synopsis 
This drama is about a pure man who accepts a dangerous destiny for the woman he loves. It is a love story that spans over two hundred years. Moon Soo-ho (Kim Rae-won) is a businessman with a pure heart who braves danger for his love Jung Hae-ra (Shin Se-kyung), who is a travel agent but never traveled abroad.

Cast

Main 
 Kim Rae-won as Moon Soo-ho / Lee Myung-so (Black Knight)
Sung Yu-bin as young Moon Soo-ho / young Lee Myung-so
He is a successful CEO who is strict to himself, and he never shows his true colors. But when he is in love, he is a pure romanticist. After the death of his parents, a friend of his father became his guardian and looked after him. He and his guardian's daughter grew up like siblings, and he slowly developed feelings for her. However, the joy did not last long. He felt betrayed and hurt by his guardian and his daughter. When he is on the verge of breaking down from despair, a delivery woman tells him that a big fortune is waiting for him in the future. Her words become a prophecy and he keeps on rolling. The endless luck scares him because he worries that he might have to repay all of it later. Then, he meets the guardian's daughter again. She makes his heart flutter even though she hurt him. She is his first love.

 Shin Se-kyung as Jung Hae-ra / Boon-yi
Park Ga-ram as young Jung Hae-ra / young Boon-yi
She works for a travel agency. Even though she is poor, she takes care of her aunt and maintains a cheerful attitude. As a child she was pretty well-off. However, when her parents died and her family went bankrupt, her life turned upside down. She did not lose hope because she had a job, a house, and a boyfriend. But misfortunes never come alone. Her work, family and lover drag her to the pit of her life. Then she remembers the wine-colored coat she had ordered at Sharon's Boutique as a child. She never got to pick it up because her family suddenly went bankrupt. Could her life have changed if she had picked up that coat? After she unexpectedly finds the coat, strange things start to happen to her. Then she meets him, the man who calls himself her black knight.

 Seo Ji-hye as Sharon / Choi Seo-rin
Lee Ji-eun as young Choi Seo-rin
She is the designer at Sharon's Boutique. Although she attracts much attention with her beauty, her personality is selfish, cranky, and egocentric like a child. She keeps a huge secret. She has been living for more than 200 years without getting old or dying. Ever since 'that day', she has been spending lonely days without aging. She is receiving punishment for the sin she committed 200 years ago, but she is so stricken with a victim mentality that she never grows or finds enlightenment. When Hae-ra visits her boutique to find the coat she had ordered as a child, she tries to escape from karma by being generous to Hae-ra. She desperately wants to break away from the endless punishment. But at that moment, she meets him again. The man she has been missing for hundreds of years. The man she believes to be her destiny.

 Chang Mi-hee as  Becky / Jang Baek-hee 
She is a perfumer and cultural heritage commentator of Seochon. A mysterious aura surrounds her entire body. Her other job is a power blogger. She lived for 250 years and writes interesting stories on her blog. No one knows that those stories are her actual experiences. She hopes to break away from the punishment and become mortal again. Then she meets the lovers who are tangled up by a terribly cruel fate. They marked the beginning of her karma.

Supporting

People around Hae-ra 
 Hwang Jung-min as Lee Sook-hee
 Shin So-yul as Kim Young-mi
 Park Sung-hoon as Park Gon
 Kim Byeong-ok as Park Chul-min
 Kim Hyun-joon as Choi Ji-hoon

People at Soo-ho's company 
 Jung Jin as Soo-ho's secretary

People at Hae-ra's Travel Agency 
 Han Ji-sun as Kang Joo-hee
 Kim Gyeol as Head Manager
 Cha Cheong-hwa as Team leader

People at Sharon's Boutique 
 Kim Seol-jin as Yang Seung-goo

Others 
 Yeom Dong-heon as Manager Cho
 Song Sam-dong as Jeom Bok
 Jo Hyun-do as young Jeom Bok
 Lim Yong-sun as Guard
 Lee Seung-hyung as Hae-ra's father

Special appearance

Production 
The series was written by Kim In-young and directed by Han Sang-woo, who have previously worked together on Unkind Ladies (2015).
The first script reading was held on October 8, 2017.
The series was the first television production of n.CH Entertainment, a new company set up by former S.M. C&C CEO Jung Chang-hwan.

Original soundtrack

Part 1

Part 2

Part 3

Part 4

Part 5

Part 6

Part 7

Ratings 
 In this table,  represent the lowest ratings and  represent the highest ratings.

Awards and nominations

References

External links 
  
 
 

Korean Broadcasting System television dramas
Korean-language television shows
2017 South Korean television series debuts
2018 South Korean television series endings
South Korean romantic fantasy television series